Ackroyd Drive Greenlink is a 0.87 hectare Local Nature Reserve in Mile End in the London Borough of Tower Hamlets. It forms a green corridor between Tower Hamlets Cemetery Park and Mile End Park.

The Greenlink is a linear site between Ackroyd Drive and a railway viaduct. It is bisected by roads into five rectangular plots. From the south these are Cowslip Meadow, allotments, Blackberry Meadow, Peartree Meadow and Primrose Meadow.

References

External links 

Local nature reserves in Greater London
Nature reserves in the London Borough of Tower Hamlets
Mile End